Shobhit Institute of Engineering & Technology (SIET), also known as Shobhit Deemed University and unofficially Shobhit University, is higher-education institute deemed-to-be-university located in Meerut, Uttar Pradesh, India.

History
Shobhit Institute of Engineering & Technology was established in by the NICE Society, which was itself established in July 1989. The institute included two engineering colleges, at Gangoh and Meerut, the latter better known as Shobhit Institute of Engineering and Technology, Saharanpur. The college was affiliated to Uttar Pradesh Technical University and later to Gautam Buddh Technical University, both now Dr. A.P.J. Abdul Kalam Technical University.

In November 2006 the Meerut college received deemed to be university status, and became popularly known as Shobhit University, Meerut. In July 2012 the Gangoh college became a university under the Shobhit Vishwavidhaylaya, Uttar Pradesh Adhiniyam, 2011, officially called Shobhit University.

Location
The institute is located on the Delhi-Meerut-Dehradun National Highway (NH-58).

Research activities
The university undertook teaching and research as essential ingredients of its activities with emphasis on research productivity, innovations in teaching and progress in emerging areas through its Post-Graduate and Doctoral programs.

References

External links
 

Deemed universities in Uttar Pradesh
Private universities in Uttar Pradesh
Engineering colleges in Meerut
Private engineering colleges in Uttar Pradesh
Educational institutions established in 2006
2006 establishments in Uttar Pradesh